Mathematics (sometimes referred to as General Math, to distinguish it from other mathematics-related events) is one of several academic events sanctioned by the University Interscholastic League.  It is also a competition held by the Texas Math and Science Coaches Association, using the same rules as the UIL.

Mathematics is designed to test students' understanding of advanced mathematics.  The UIL contest began in 1943, and is among the oldest of all UIL academic contests.

Eligibility
Students in Grade 6 through Grade 12 are eligible to enter this event.  For competition purposes, separate divisions are held for Grades 6-8 and Grades 9-12, with separate subjects covered on each test as follows:
The test for Grades 6-8 covers numeration systems, arithmetic operations involving whole numbers, integers, fractions, decimals, exponents, order of operations, probability, statistics, number theory, simple interest, measurements and conversions, plus possibly geometry and algebra problems (as appropriate for the grade level).
The test for Grades 9-12 covers algebra I and II, geometry, trigonometry, math analysis, analytic geometry, pre-calculus, and elementary calculus.

For Grades 6-8 each school may send up to three students per division.  In order for a school to participate in team competition in a division, the school must send three students in that division.

For Grades 9-12 each school may send up to four students; however, in districts with more than eight schools the district executive committee can limit participation to three students per school.  In order for a school to participate in team competition, the school must send at least three students.

Rules and Scoring
At the junior high level, the test consists of 50 questions and is limited to only 30 minutes.  At the high school level, the test consists of 60 questions and is limited to only 40 minutes.  Both tests are multiple choice.

There is no intermediate time signal given; at the end of the allotted time the students must immediately stop writing (they are not allowed to finish incomplete answers started before the stop signal).  If contestants are in the process of writing down an answer, they 
may finish; they may not do additional work on a test question.

The questions can be answered in any order; a skipped question is not scored.

Calculators are permitted provided they are (or were) commercially available models, run quietly, and do not require auxiliary power.  One calculator plus one spare is permitted.

Five points are awarded for each correct answer at the junior high level while six points are awarded at the high school level.  Two points are deducted for each wrong answer.  Skipped or unanswered questions are not scored.

Determining the Winner

Elementary and Junior High
Scoring is posted for only the top six individual places and the top three teams.

There are no tiebreakers for either individual or team competition.

High School Level
The top three individuals and the top team (determined based on the scores of the top three individuals) advance to the next round.  In addition, within each region, the highest-scoring second place team from all district competitions advances as the "wild card" to regional competition (provided the team has four members), and within the state, the highest-scoring second place team from all regional competitions advances as the wild card to the state competition.  Members of advancing teams who did not place individually remain eligible to compete for individual awards at higher levels.

For individual competition, the tiebreaker is percent accuracy (number of questions answered correctly divided by number of questions attempted).  If a tie still exists all tied individuals will advance.

For team competition, the score of the fourth-place individual is used as the tiebreaker.  If a team has only three members it is not eligible to participate in the tiebreaker.  If the fourth-place score still results in a tie, all remaining tied teams will advance.  At the state level, ties for first place are not broken.

For district meet academic championship and district meet sweepstakes awards, points are awarded to the school as follows:
Individual places: 1st—15, 2nd—12, 3rd—10, 4th—8, 5th—6, and 6th—4.
Team places: 1st—10 and 2nd—5.
The maximum number of points a school can earn in Mathematics is 47 (15, 12, and 10 points for an individual and 10 points for a top team ranking), though all teams obtaining this number of points is extremely rare.

List of prior winners

Individual
NOTE: For privacy reasons, only the winning school is shown.

Team
NOTE: The team competition did not start until the 1992-93 scholastic year.

References

External links
Official UIL Rules for Mathematics--High School
Official UIL Rules for Mathematics--Junior High

University Interscholastic League